The International Carbon Reduction and Offset Alliance is a non-profit membership organisation which promotes best practice across the voluntary carbon market. ICROA’s membership consists of those established carbon reduction and offset providers based in the United States, European and Asia-Pacific markets which commit to the ICROA Code of Best Practice.

ICROA was established in 2008 to provide self-regulation of the voluntary carbon market.  Members produce an annual report demonstrating compliance with the ICROA Code. The ICROA Code promotes a combined ‘reduce and offset’ approach  to carbon management and has specific requirements for how members provide their carbon footprinting, Greenhouse Gas (GHG) reduction advice and offsetting services.  ICROA aims that member’s compliance with their Code will bring credibility to the voluntary carbon market.

History 

ICROA was launched by eight carbon reduction and offset providers on June 9, 2008. Along with the initial eight, ICROA has been open to new members which meet its membership criteria, and this was reflected in their early announcement that they intended to increase fourfold over the following twelve months. Nevertheless, the co-chairman of the organization, Jonathan Shopley, stated in 2008 that most offset providers would not be qualified to join.

With ICROA headquartered in the United Kingdom, the eight founding members consisted of five British firms (Carbon Clear, The Carbon Neutral Company, ClimateCare, CO2balance and Targetneutral), two from the United States (Native Energy and TerraPass), and one from Australia (Climate Friendly).  Current membership is eleven companies worldwide.

The ICROA Code of Best Practice 

The ICROA Code is available in full on the ICROA website. The key points are:

 Members will help their customers to measure their carbon footprint according to accepted international standards, and will set their emissions reduction targets based on scientific assessments.
 The ICROA Code explicitly recognizes that offsetting alone is not a sound approach to carbon management, therefore members should support a ‘reduce and offset’ approach to carbon management.
 Offsetting projects must meet the following criteria: real, permanent, independently verified, unique and additional. So far ICROA accepts the following standards: Clean Development Mechanism/Joint Implementation, Climate Action Reserve, Gold Standard, Voluntary Carbon Standard. ICROA may also use offsets from approved Government schemes. This is on the proviso that the Government scheme certified offsets will only be used within the context of the Government scheme and will not be sold as voluntary offsets outside the context of the scheme, unless these methodologies have been separately approved by ICROA. Schemes that have approved for use so far by ICROA members are: US EPA Climate Leaders.
 ICROA members must follow the ICROA Code, and produce an annual report demonstrating their compliance.

Criticism 
In February 2009, ICROA criticised the UK Government quality assurance scheme for carbon offsets as it did not include voluntary emissions cuts (VERS).  In a statement a spokesman said, "Unfortunately, it still fails to recognise VERs and we feel very strongly there's no reason for this." In turn ICROA was criticised by Dr Bruce Elliott, managing director of carbon offset company Clear which had achieved accreditation under the government scheme. Elliot stated that, "The trade body which represents offset organisations who sell VERs, ICROA, have unsurprisingly been vociferous in their criticism of the scheme.  Many of its members have substantial investments in VER projects which now face an uncertain future without the government’s backing.  This financial conflict of interest is readily apparent in their persistent public criticism of a scheme which matches or sets higher standards than its own code of conduct for the majority of criteria."

See also
Carbon emission trading
Contraction and Convergence
Carbon Offset
In June 2011, The UK Government's Quality Assurance Scheme (QAS) for Carbon Offsetting, closed down. In a letter to the members of the QAS Advisory Board, including ICROA, the Head of DECC's Low Carbon Economy Unit stated 'The carbon market has moved on substantially since the introduction of the QAS and we now believe it is for the market to set best practice for carbon offsetting.'
International Carbon Reduction and Offset Alliance (ICROA), the leading membership body of organisations offering offsets and carbon management services has been working with DECC as part of the QAS Advisory Board and believes this is the right course of action for DECC to take http://www.prnewswire.co.uk/news-releases/decc-quality-assurance-scheme-for-carbon-offsetting-to-end-on-june-30th-145337855.html

References

Energy economics
Environmental organisations based in the United Kingdom